Germaine Kamayirese is an engineer and politician in Rwanda, who served as the Minister of Emergency Management and Refugee Affairs in the Rwandan cabinet, from 18 October 2018 until she was dropped from cabinet on 27 February 2020.

Before that, from 24 July 2014 until 18 October 2018, she served as the Minister of State for Infrastructure responsible for Energy, Water and Sanitation.

Background and education
She was born in Nyarugenge District on 5 August 1981. From 2000 until 2005, she studied at the Kigali Institute of Science and Technology (KIST), which today is the College of Science and Technology (Rwanda), a constituent college of the University of Rwanda. She holds a Bachelor of Electricalmechanical Engineering, awarded by KIST in 2005. She also holds a Masters of Communications Management, awarded jointly in 2010 by KIST and Coventry University, in the United Kingdom.

Career
From 2008 until 2011, Germaine Kamayirese served as a network specialist at "Rwanda Utilities Regulatory Agency" (RURA). From 2012 until 2014, she served as a network specialist at "Tigo-Rwanda". From 2010 until 2011 Kamayirese served as an advisor at the "Institute of Engineering Architecture Rwanda". As of September 2017, she was a member of "Rwanda Women Engineers Association" (RWEA).

In her capacity as the State Minister responsible for energy, water and sanitation in the Ministry of Infrastructure, she was in charge of executing the country's national strategy and policy of power production, transmission, distribution and trading within Rwanda and with foreign energy entities. She was also responsible for the provision of reliable, safe and sustainable water supply and sanitation services throughout Rwanda.

In a cabinet reshuffle on 18 October 2018, Ms Kamayirese was named the new Minister of Emergency Management and Refugee Affairs.

Family
Germaine Kamayirese is a mother of four children.

Other considerations
In December 2014, Forbes Magazine named her among "The 20 Youngest Power Women In Africa 2014".

See also
 Judith Uwizeye
 Gérardine Mukeshimana
 Yvonne Khamati

References

External links
Website of the Rwanda Ministry of Disaster Management and Refugee Affairs  
Website of the Rwanda Ministry of Infrastructure

Living people
1981 births
People from Kigali
Rwandan engineers
Rwandan women engineers
College of Science and Technology (Rwanda) alumni
Alumni of Coventry University
Government ministers of Rwanda
Infrastructure ministers of Rwanda
Women government ministers of Rwanda
21st-century Rwandan politicians
21st-century Rwandan women politicians
21st-century women engineers